The Nee Soon Group Representation Constituency is a five-member Group Representation Constituency (GRC) in the north region of Singapore. The GRC includes most of Yishun town, the private residential areas along Sembawang Road and Upper Thomson Road, the southern part of Sembawang and the Nee Soon Camp. The GRC consists of five divisions: Chong Pang, Nee Soon Central, Nee Soon East, Nee Soon South and Nee Soon Link. The current MPs are from the People's Action Party (PAP) K Shanmugam, Carrie Tan, Derrick Goh, Louis Ng and Muhammad Faishal Ibrahim.

Members of Parliament

Electoral results

Elections in 2010s

Elections in 2020s

References

General Election Result's including rejected ballots from 1955-2015

Singaporean electoral divisions
Yishun
Sembawang